Colerain Forges Mansion is a historic home located at Franklin Township in Huntingdon County, Pennsylvania. It was built in four stages between the late-18th century and mid- to late-19th century. It appears as a two-story, five bay, "T"-shaped dwelling with a one-story, full-length porch in the Federal style.  The oldest section is the two-story, plastered midsection. The frame portion to the east dates to the 1830s, and the brick section to the west to the 1840s.  The rear section dates to the 1860s-1870s, and is a two-story board-and-batten structure. Also on the property is a -story, gable roofed stone outbuilding and a small board-and-batten shed. The house was built as the ironmaster's mansion at Colerain Forge.

It was listed on the National Register of Historic Places in 1990.

References

External links
Historic American Buildings Survey, seven drawings

Houses on the National Register of Historic Places in Pennsylvania
Federal architecture in Pennsylvania
Houses in Huntingdon County, Pennsylvania
National Register of Historic Places in Huntingdon County, Pennsylvania